Ollauri is a village in the northwest province and autonomous community of La Rioja, Spain.

References

Populated places in La Rioja (Spain)